Angiotensin-converting enzyme, or ACE, is a central component of the renin–angiotensin system (RAS), which controls blood pressure by regulating the volume of fluids in the body. It converts the hormone angiotensin I to the active vasoconstrictor angiotensin II. Therefore, ACE indirectly increases blood pressure by causing blood vessels to constrict. ACE inhibitors are widely used as pharmaceutical drugs for treatment of cardiovascular diseases.

Other lesser known functions of ACE are degradation of bradykinin, substance P and amyloid beta-protein.

Nomenclature 
ACE is also known by the following names:
 dipeptidyl carboxypeptidase I
 peptidase P
 dipeptide hydrolase
 peptidyl dipeptidase
 angiotensin converting enzyme
 kininase II
 angiotensin I-converting enzyme
 carboxycathepsin
 dipeptidyl carboxypeptidase
 "hypertensin converting enzyme" peptidyl dipeptidase I
 peptidyl-dipeptide hydrolase
 peptidyldipeptide hydrolase
 endothelial cell peptidyl dipeptidase
 peptidyl dipeptidase-4
 PDH
 peptidyl dipeptide hydrolase
 DCP
 CD143

Function 
ACE hydrolyzes peptides by the removal of a dipeptide from the C-terminus. Likewise it converts the inactive decapeptide angiotensin I to the octapeptide angiotensin II by removing the dipeptide His-Leu.

ACE is a central component of the renin–angiotensin system (RAS), which controls blood pressure by regulating the volume of fluids in the body.

Angiotensin II is a potent vasoconstrictor in a substrate concentration-dependent manner. Angiotensin II binds to the type 1 angiotensin II receptor (AT1), which sets off a number of actions that result in vasoconstriction and therefore increased blood pressure.

ACE is also part of the kinin-kallikrein system where it degrades bradykinin, a potent vasodilator, and other vasoactive peptides.

Kininase II is the same as angiotensin-converting enzyme. Thus, the same enzyme (ACE) that generates a vasoconstrictor (ANG II) also disposes of vasodilators (bradykinin).

Mechanism 
ACE is a zinc metalloproteinase. The zinc center catalyses the peptide hydrolysis. Reflecting the critical role of zinc, ACE can be inhibited by metal-chelating agents.

The E384 residue is mechanistically critical. As a general base, it deprotonates the zinc-bound water, producing a nucleophilic Zn-OH center. The resulting ammonium group then serves as a general acid to cleave the C-N bond.

The function of the chloride ion is very complex and is highly debated. The anion activation by chloride is a characteristic feature of ACE. It was experimentally determined that the activation of hydrolysis by chloride is highly dependent on the substrate. While it increases hydrolysis rates for e.g. Hip-His-Leu it inhibits hydrolysis of other substrates like Hip-Ala-Pro. Under physiological conditions the enzyme reaches about 60% of its maximal activity toward angiotensin I while it reaches its full activity toward bradykinin. It is therefore assumed that the function of the anion activation in ACE provides high substrate specificity. Other theories say that the chloride might simply stabilize the overall structure of the enzyme.

Genetics 
The ACE gene, ACE, encodes two isozymes. The somatic isozyme is expressed in many tissues, mainly in the lung, including vascular endothelial cells, epithelial kidney cells, and testicular Leydig cells, whereas the germinal is expressed only in sperm. Brain tissue has ACE enzyme, which takes part in local RAS and converts Aβ42 (which aggregates into plaques) to Aβ40 (which is thought to be less toxic) forms of beta amyloid. The latter is predominantly a function of N domain portion on the ACE enzyme. ACE inhibitors that cross the blood–brain barrier and have preferentially selected N-terminal activity may therefore cause accumulation of Aβ42 and progression of dementia.

Disease relevance 
ACE inhibitors are widely used as pharmaceutical drugs in the treatment of conditions such as high blood pressure, heart failure, diabetic nephropathy, and type 2 diabetes mellitus.

ACE inhibitors inhibit ACE competitively. That results in the decreased formation of angiotensin II and decreased metabolism of bradykinin, which leads to systematic dilation of the arteries and veins and a decrease in arterial blood pressure. In addition, inhibiting angiotensin II formation diminishes angiotensin II-mediated aldosterone secretion from the adrenal cortex, leading to a decrease in water and sodium reabsorption and a reduction in extracellular volume.

ACE's effect on Alzheimer's disease is still highly debated. Alzheimer patients usually show higher ACE levels in their brain. Some studies suggest that ACE inhibitors that are able to pass the blood-brain-barrier (BBB) could enhance the activity of major amyloid-beta peptide degrading enzymes like neprilysin in the brain resulting in a slower development of Alzheimer's disease. More recent research suggests that ACE inhibitors can reduce risk of Alzheimer's disease in the absence of apolipoprotein E4 alleles (ApoE4), but will have no effect in ApoE4- carriers. Another more recent hypothesis is that higher levels of ACE can prevent Alzheimer's. It is assumed that ACE can degrade beta-amyloid in brain blood vessels and therefore help prevent the progression of the disease.

A negative correlation between the ACE1 D-allele frequency and the prevalence and mortality of COVID-19 has been established.

Pathology 
 Elevated levels of ACE are also found in sarcoidosis, and are used in diagnosing and monitoring this disease. Elevated levels of ACE are also found in leprosy, hyperthyroidism, acute hepatitis, primary biliary cirrhosis, diabetes mellitus, multiple myeloma, osteoarthritis, amyloidosis, Gaucher disease, pneumoconiosis, histoplasmosis and miliary tuberculosis. It is also noted in some patients with extensive plaque psoriasis.
 Serum levels are decreased in renal disease, obstructive pulmonary disease, and hypothyroidism.

Influence on athletic performance 

The angiotensin converting enzyme gene has more than 160 polymorphisms described as of 2018.

Studies have shown that different genotypes of angiotensin converting enzyme can lead to varying influence on athletic performance.

The rs1799752 I/D polymorphism consists of either an insertion (I) or absence (D) of a 287 base pair alanine sequence in intron 16 of the gene. The DD genotype is associated with higher plasma levels of the ACE protein, the DI genotype with intermediate levels, and II with lower levels. During physical exercise, due to higher levels of the ACE for D-allele carriers, hence higher capacity to produce angiotensin II, the blood pressure will increase sooner than for I-allele carriers. This results in a lower maximal heart rate and lower maximum oxygen uptake (VO2max). Therefore, D-allele carriers have a 10% increased risk of cardiovascular diseases. Furthermore, the D-allele is associated with a greater increase in left ventricular growth in response to training compared to the I-allele. On the other hand, I-allele carriers usually show an increased maximal heart rate due to lower ACE levels, higher maximum oxygen uptake and therefore show an enhanced endurance performance. The I allele is found with increased frequency in elite distance runners, rowers and cyclists. Short distance swimmers show an increased frequency of the D-allele, since their discipline relies more on strength than endurance.

History
The enzyme was reported by Leonard T. Skeggs Jr. in 1956. The crystal structure of human testis ACE was solved in the year 2002 by R. Natesh, S. Schwager & E. Sturrock in the lab of K. Ravi Acharya. It is located mainly in the capillaries of the lungs but can also be found in endothelial and kidney epithelial cells.

See also 
 ACE inhibitors
 Angiotensin-converting enzyme 2 (ACE2)
 Hypotensive transfusion reaction
 Renin–angiotensin system

References

Further reading

External links 
  – the Angiotensin-Converting Enzyme Structure in Interactive 3D
 
 

EC 3.4.15
Kinin–kallikrein system
Proteases